Taluk Thiam is a subdistrict in the Phrom Phiram District of Phitsanulok Province, Thailand.

Geography
Taluk Thiam lies in the Nan Basin, which is part of the Chao Phraya watershed.

Administration
The following is a list of the subdistrict's mubans (villages):

Notes

References

Tambon of Phitsanulok province
Populated places in Phitsanulok province